Florina (Flórina; known also by some alternative names) is a town and municipality in the mountainous northwestern Macedonia, Greece. Its motto is, 'Where Greece begins'.

The town of Florina is the capital of the Florina regional unit and also the seat of the eponymous municipality. It belongs to the administrative region of Western Macedonia. The town's population is 17,686 people (2011 census).

Geography

Florina is the gateway to the Prespa Lakes and, until the modernisation of the road system, of the old town of Kastoria. It is located west of Edessa, northwest of Kozani, and northeast of Ioannina and Kastoria cities. Outside the Greek borders it is in proximity to Korçë in Albania and Bitola in North Macedonia. The nearest airports are situated to the east and the south (in Kozani). The mountains of Verno lie to the southwest and Varnous to the northwest.

Winters bring heavy snow and long periods of temperature below freezing point. Furthermore, the town and the surrounding valley is usually covered in thick fog during the winter months that may last even for weeks under specific conditions. During the summer months it becomes a busy market town with an economy boosted by summer and, mostly, winter tourism due to the heavy snowfalls and the nearby ski resorts.

Even though Florina was the site of the first rail line built in the southern Ottoman provinces in the late 19th century, its rail system remains undeveloped. Today, Florina is linked by a single track standard gauge line to Thessaloniki and Bitola, and to Kozani (meter gauge) where it was intended to continue south and link up with the terminal in Kalambaka, in Thessaly but this did not proceed due to the 1930s financial crisis.

Florina is passed by GR-2 (Lake Prespa – Edessa) and GR-3/E65 (Kozani – Florina – Niki – Bitola). The new Motorway 27 (A27) will run east of Florina with its Florina-Niki segment already operational since 2015. The historic Via Egnatia is situated to the east.

Climate
Florina is one of the coldest towns in Greece, because of its elevation and geographic position. Heavy snowfalls, thick fog and below-freezing temperatures are common during the winter months, while the summers are mild. Under the Köppen climate classification, Florina has a humid subtropical climate (Cfa) with strong hot-summer continental climate (Dfa) influences.

On 18 January 2012, a temperature of -25.1 °C was recorded by the HNMS's station with several reports, however, in the local press for temperatures in villages of the municipality that reached -32 °C, but there was no official record of such temperature. The National Observatory of Athens's station reported a temperature of -22.2 °C a day earlier in Florina, while the same station continuously recorded minimum temperatures below -20 °C from 16 January 2012 until 19 January 2012, with the average maximum temperature for January just -0.6 °C, and the prevalence for 13 consecutive days of temperatures below 0 °C 24 hours a day. The above situation resulted in the Greek General Secretariat of Civil Protection to declare the municipality of Florina in a state of emergency on 16 January 2012, at the request of the mayor of Florina, due to the polar temperatures and the intense snowfall that prevailed for days.

Name
The city's original Byzantine name, Χλέρινον (Chlérinon, "full of green vegetation"), derives from the Greek word χλωρός (chlōrós, "fresh" or "green vegetation"). The name was sometimes Latinized as Florinon (from the Latin flora, "vegetation") in the later Byzantine period, and in early Ottoman documents the forms Chlerina and Florina are both used, with the latter becoming standard after the 17th century. The form with [f] (φλωρός) is a local dialect form of χλωρός in Greek. The local Slavic name for the city is Lerin (Лерин), which is a borrowing of the Byzantine Greek name, but with the loss of the initial  characteristic of the local dialect.

Municipality
The current municipality of Florina was formed at the 2011 local government reform by the merger of the following 4 former municipalities, that since 2011 became municipal units:
Florina
Kato Kleines
Meliti
Perasma

The municipality has an area of 819.698 km2, and the municipal unit 150.634 km2.

Municipal Unit subdivisions
The municipal unit of Florina is further divided into the following communities:
Alona
Armenochori
Florina
Koryfi
Mesonisi
Proti
Skopia
Trivouno

History

Within the boundaries of the present-day city lie the remains of a Hellenistic settlement on the hill of Agios Panteleimon. Archaeologists excavated on the site in 1930–1934, but a hotel was later built over the ruins. Excavations began again in the 1980s and the total excavated area is now around 8,000 metres square. The buildings uncovered are mostly residential blocks, and the range of finds suggests that the site was continuously inhabited from the 4th century BC until its destruction by fire in the 1st century BC. Many of these finds are now on display in the Archaeological Museum of Florina.

The town is first mentioned in 1334, when the Serbian king Stefan Dušan established a certain Sphrantzes Palaeologus as commander of the fortress of Chlerenon. By 1385, the place had fallen to the Ottomans. An Ottoman defter (cadastral tax census) for the year 1481 records a settlement of 243 households.

Greeks from Florina participated in the Greek Revolution of 1821 with the most important fighter being Aggelinas who also fought in Crete while others also fought in Mesologgi. Members of Filiki Eteria were the brothers Loukas Nedelkos and Nikolaos Nedelkos, who were born in the Florina region.

Florina and its inhabitants greatly contributed to the Macedonian Struggle. Prominent leaders included Nikolaos Pyrzas, and Petros Chatzitasis.

In the late Ottoman period the area surrounding Florina supported the Internal Macedonian Revolutionary Organization (IMRO) who fought against the Ottomans. During the Macedonian Struggle the Greek makedonomachoi gained significant advantage towards the Bulgarian Exarchists within 10 months in 1905 and extended their zone of control in various regions of western Macedonia including the plains north and south of Florina. In 1912 came under the control of the Greek forces as a result of the Ottoman defeat in the First Balkan War. The town was again in the firing line during World War I, during which it was occupied by Bulgaria, and during the Axis Occupation in World War II, when the town became a centre of Slavic separatism.

For part of the Greek Civil War (1946–1949) the mountains of the Florina area were under communist control. The Slavic-Macedonian National Liberation Front, later simply the National Liberation Front or NOF, had a significant presence in the area: by 1946, seven Slav Macedonian partisan units were operating in the Florina area, and NOF had a regional committee based in Florina. When the NOF merged with the Democratic Army of Greece (DSE), many Slav Macedonians in the region enlisted as volunteers in the DSE. When the Communists were defeated on 12 February 1949 by the Greek army thousands of communists and Slav Macedonians were evacuated or fled to Yugoslavia and the Eastern Bloc.

Transport

Rail
The city is served by Florina station on the Thessaloniki–Bitola line, with local trains to Thessaloniki.

Economy

Florina is a market town with an economy dominated by agriculture, forestry, summer and winter tourism, cross-border trading and the sale of local produce such as grain, grapes, and vegetables including Florina peppers. It also has textile mills and is known for locally manufactured leather handicrafts.

The most notable industrial activity is the very large Ptolemaia-Florina lignite mine.

Its university changed in 2002 from being a branch of the Aristotle University of Thessaloniki, to a part of the University of Western Macedonia. After 2004, four departments that previously belonged to the Aristotle University, reinforced its potential.

Florina has 8 radio stations, 2 daily political newspapers, 4 weekly ones, one women's press and two newspapers on sports.

During the 1950s and 1960s, the area lost much of its population to emigration, both to Athens and Thessaloniki as well as US, Canada, Australia and Germany. Following Greece's EU membership and the economic upturn, many from Germany returned.

Landmarks

Archaeological Museum of Florina
Florina Museum of Modern Art
The Florina Art Gallery
Folklore Museum of the Aristotle Association
Folklore Museum of the Culture Club

Demographics
Austrian diplomat Johann Georg von Hahn visited the city in 1861 and wrote about it in his travel log From Belgrade to Salonica. In it he writes that "[a]bout the houses in Florina, we should indicate that there are at most 3000, with half of the population Albanian and Turkish Muslims and the other half Christian Bulgarians." According to an 1878 French ethnographic book Florina was a town of 1500 households, inhabited by 2800 Muslims and 1800 Bulgarians.<ref>„Ethnographie des Vilayets d'Andrinople, de Monastir et de Salonique, Ethnographie Vilayet de Monsati., p.6-21</ref> In 1896 French diplomat and traveller Victor Bérard visited Florina. He described Florina as "consisting of 1500 houses of Albanians and "converted Slavs", with perhaps a hundred "Turkish" families and 500 Christian families." Bérard noted that "These Slavs nonetheless call themselves Greek and speak Greek—with us at least". In 1901/1902 school year statistics, Greek students were clearly much more than the Bulgarian ones.

A Jewish Sephardi community was present in Florina during the 17th century. Under Ottoman rule, the Jews of Florina had close ties with the Jewish community of Monastir (modern Bitola). Romani people migrated from Anatolia to Florina. In the mid to late 1910s, some Florina Romani migrated to Elbasan and Korçë and compose most of their urban modern Romani populations.

According to Tasos Kostopoulos, after Florina became part of Greece, its population numbered 10,000 with two thirds being Muslim. Many Christian inhabitants of Florina were Slavic speakers with the remainder composed of 30 Aromanian families and 89 Greek refugee families from Thrace and Asia Minor. Florina Christians supported the Greek cause and the Bulgarians were aware that more than half were "Grecomans".

Following the Balkan Wars (1912-1913), the large Aromanian community in Monastir (modern Bitola) was disappointed that the city became part of Serbia and they migrated to Greece. Many went to Thessaloniki and others settled in Florina, where in the late 1920s a new neighbourhood was established named Agia Paraskevi with a population of 600 refugee Aromanian families. During the First World War, 60 Jewish families resettled in Florina after they left Monastir in 1916 to avoid the shelling of the city, later some other Monastirli Jewish families also went to live in Florina after the war.

The Greek census (1920) recorded 12,513 people in the town and in 1923 there were 4,650 inhabitants (or 1076 families) who were Muslim. Muslim Albanians from Florina and the wider region during the Greek-Turkish population exchange (1923) based on religious criteria were sent to Turkey, and mainly resettled in Bursa. Following the Greek-Turkish population exchange, in 1926 within Florina there were Greek refugee families from East Thrace (79), Asia Minor (54), Pontus (7) and the Caucasus (44). The Greek census (1928) recorded 10,585 town inhabitants. In 1928, there were 178 refugee families (750 people) and the Jewish community numbered 500 people.

Local Jews were involved in the textile, agricultural and raw material sectors of Florina's economy. Florina was occupied in World War Two and Jews came under German rule. The Jewish community numbered 400 people in 1940. During April 1943, 372 Florina Jews were sent by the Germans first to the Hirsch ghetto in Thessaloniki and later in May sent to the Auschwitz concentration camp where they were gassed. In 1945, the Florina Jewish community numbered 64 people, a reduction of 84 percent due to the Holocaust. The Jewish population declined and by 1959 there were 7 Jews in Florina, 1 in 1973 and 0 in 1983.

The Romani of Florina are sedentary and in 1968 they converted from Islam to Orthodoxy. In the modern period, Florina Romani have distanced themselves from their relatives in Elbasan and Korçë, over concerns that links with Muslim Romani could negatively impact their local standing in the area they reside.

During the late twentieth century, Florina numbered some 15,000 inhabitants. Its population was composed of Slavophone Dopii, the Greek Anatolian refugees from the Greek-Turkish population exchange and their descendants, Greeks who had recently left the former Soviet Union, Aromanians and Hellenised Aromanians from Bitola who went to Florina in 1913, Romani, Albanians, and a small number of foreigners.

In fieldwork done by Riki Van Boeschoten in late 1993, the population of Florina is mixed and Greek is often the language used for communication. Minority languages are used in the town, especially on market days when farmers from the villages arrive in Florina to sell their produce. The Romani community of Florina speak Romani and are multilingual in all other languages used in the region.

Florina in cinema
Movies of the Greek cinema, filmed in the area by Theodoros Angelopoulos include:The BeekeeperThe Suspended Step of the StorkUlysses' GazeNotable people

 Alexis Alexoudis (born 1972), footballer
 Mary Coustas (born 1964), Australian actor
 Necati Cumalı (1921-2001), Turkish novelist, short-story writer & poet
 Peter Daicos Australian Football player (AFL); family from Vevi, Florina region
 Dimitris Kalamaras, sculptor
 Dimitrios Makris (1901–81), Member of Parliament & Minister
 Pericles A. Mitkas (born 1962), electronic & computer engineer, Rector of the Aristotle University of Thessaloniki
 Nikolaos Pyrzas (1880-1947), leader during the Macedonian Struggle
 Nadia Tass (active 1979 to present), Australian director & actor
 Vassy (born 1983), Australian singer, songwriter & producer; family possibly of Florina origin
 Pavlos Voskopoulos (born 1964), politician & leader of the Rainbow party

Gallery

ReferencesThe Columbia Encyclopedia, 2004Encyclopædia Britannica, 2005The Penguin Encyclopedia of Places, 1999Rough Guide to Greece, Mark Ellingham et al.'', 2000

Notes

External links
City of Florina 
Florina regional unit 
Awarded "EDEN – European Destinations of Excellence" non traditional tourist destination 2007

 
Municipalities of Western Macedonia
Greek prefectural capitals
Populated places in Florina (regional unit)